Plicifusus is a genus of sea snails, marine gastropod mollusks in the family Buccinidae, the true whelks.

Species
Species within the genus Plicifusus include:
 Plicifusus bambusus Tiba, 1980
 Plicifusus croceus (Dall, 1907)
 Plicifusus elaeodus (Dall, 1907)
 Plicifusus hastarius Tiba, 1983
 Plicifusus johanseni Dall, 1919
 Plicifusus kroyeri (Möller, 1842)
 Plicifusus levis Tiba, 1983
 Plicifusus maehirai Tiba, 1980
 Plicifusus mcleani Sirenko, 2009
 Plicifusus minor (Dall, 1925)
 Plicifusus oceanodromae Dall, 1919
 Plicifusus olivaceus (Aurivillius, 1885)
 Plicifusus rhyssus (Dall, 1907)
 Plicifusus rodgersi (Gould, 1860)
 Plicifusus scissuratus Dall, 1918
 Plicifusus torquatus (Petrov, 1982)

Species brought into synonymy
 Plicifusus (Microfusus) Dall, 1916: synonym of Nassaria Link, 1807
 Plicifusus (Retifusus) Dall, 1916: synonym of Retifusus Dall, 1916
 Plicifusus arcticus (Philippi, 1850): synonym of Plicifusus kroeyeri (Möller, 1842)
 Plicifusus attenuatus (Golikov & Gulbin, 1977): synonym of Retifusus attenuatus (Golikov & Gulbin, 1977) 
 Plicifusus barbarinus (Dall, 1919): synonym of Colus barbarinus Dall, 1919
 Plicifusus brunneus: synonym of Retifusus jessoensis (Schrenck, 1863)
 Plicifusus incisus Dall, 1919: synonym of Plicifusus olivaceus (Aurivillius, 1885)
 Plicifusus iwateana (Tiba, 1981): synonym of Mohnia iwateana Tiba, 1981 
 Plicifusus jamarci Okutani, 1982: synonym of Gaillea canetae (Clench & Aguayo, 1944)
 Plicifusus kroyeri [sic] : synonym of Plicifusus kroeyeri (Möller, 1842)
 Plicifusus manchuricus (A. Adams in E.A.Smith, 1875): synonym of Retifusus jessoensis (Schrenck, 1863)
 Plicifusus multicostatus (Habe & Ito, 1965): synonym of Retimohnia multicostata (Habe & Ito, 1965)
 Plicifusus obtustatus]' Golikov, in Golikov & Scarlato, 1985: synonym of Plicifusus kroeyeri (Möller, 1842)
 Plicifusus okhotskana Tiba, 1973: synonym of Plicifusus elaeodes (Dall, 1907)
 Plicifusus olivaceus Bartsch, 1929: synonym of Retifusus olivaceus (Bartsch, 1929)
 Plicifusus parvus Tiba, 1980: synonym of Retifusus roseus (Dall, 1877)
 Plicifusus polypleuratus (Dall, 1907): synonym of Plicifusus kroeyeri (Möller, 1842)
 Plicifusus pulcius (Dall, 1919): synonym of Colus pulcius (Dall, 1919)
 Plicifusus rhyssoides Dall, 1918: synonym ofPlicifusus rhyssus (Dall, 1907)
 Plicifusus saginatus Tiba, 1983: synonym of Retifusus roseus (Dall, 1877)
 Plicifusus semiplicatus (Golikov, in Golikov & Scarlato, 1985): synonym of Retifusus roseus (Dall, 1877)
 Plicifusus similis (Golikov & Gulbin, 1977): synonym of Retifusus similis (Golikov & Gulbin, 1977)
 Plicifusus stejnegeri (Dall, 1884): synonym of Turrivolutopsius stejnegeri (Dall, 1884)
 Plicifusus sugiyamai Ozaki, 1958 † : synonym of Plicifusus rhyssoides Dall, 1918
 Plicifusus wakasanus Dall, 1918: synonym of Plicifusus rhyssus (Dall, 1907)
 Plicifusus yanamii (Yokoyama, 1926): synonym of Retifusus yanamii'' (Yokoyama, 1926)

References

 Kosyan A.R. & Kantor Y.I. (2012) Revision of the genus Plicifusus Dall, 1902 (Gastropoda: Buccinidae). Ruthenica 22(2): 55-92

Buccinidae